Emil Josef Straube is a Swiss and American mathematician.

Education and career
He received from ETH Zurich in 1977 his diploma in mathematics and in 1983 his doctorate in mathematics. For the academic year 1983–1984 Straube was a visiting research scholar at the University of North Carolina at Chapel Hill. He was a visiting assistant professor from 1984 to 1986 at Indiana University Bloomington and from 1986 to 1987 at the University of Pittsburgh. From 1996 to the present, he is a full professor at Texas A&M University, where he was an assistant professor from 1987 to 1991 and an associate professor from 1991 to 1996; from 2011 to the present, he is the head of the mathematics department there. He has held visiting research positions in Switzerland, Germany, the US, and Austria.

In 1995 he was a co-winner, with Harold P. Boas, of the Stefan Bergman Prize of the American Mathematical Society. In 2006 Straube was an invited speaker at the International Congress of Mathematicians in Madrid. In 2012 he was elected a fellow of the American Mathematical Society.

Selected publications

Articles
 
 with H. P. Boas: 
 with H. P. Boas: 
 with H. P. Boas: 
 
 with Siqi Fu: 
 with Marcel K. Sucheston:

Books

References 

1952 births
Living people
20th-century American mathematicians
21st-century American mathematicians
Swiss mathematicians
Complex analysts
Mathematical analysts
ETH Zurich alumni
Texas A&M University faculty
Fellows of the American Mathematical Society